

Summerville Airport  is a county-owned, public-use airport located five nautical miles (6 mi, 9 km) northwest of the central business district of Summerville, a city in Dorchester County, South Carolina, United States. It is included in the National Plan of Integrated Airport Systems for 2011–2015, which categorized it as a general aviation facility.

Although most U.S. airports use the same three-letter location identifier for the FAA and IATA, this airport is assigned DYB by the FAA but has no designation from the IATA.

Facilities and aircraft 
Summerville Airport covers an area of 195 acres (79 ha) at an elevation of 56 feet (17 m) above mean sea level. It has one runway designated 6/24 with an asphalt surface measuring 5,000 by 75 feet (1,524 x 23 m).

For the 12-month period ending November 27, 2019, the airport had 9,250 aircraft operations, an average of 25 per day: 88% general aviation, 9% air taxi, and 3% military. At that time there were 64 aircraft based at this airport: 84% single-engine, 14% multi-engine, and 2% helicopter.

See also 

References

External links 

 Airport page at Dorchester County website
 Summerville (DYB) at the South Carolina Aeronautics Commission
 Aerial image as of February 1994 from USGS The National Map
 

Airports in South Carolina
Transportation in Dorchester County, South Carolina